The 2016–17 Basketligaen was the 42nd season of the highest professional basketball tier in Denmark. The season started on September 30, 2016 and ended on May 8, 2017. Bakken Bears won its 15th title after defeating Horsens IC 4–1 in the Finals.

Teams

Competition format
The participating teams first played a round-robin schedule with every team playing each opponent twice home and twice away for a total of 28 games. The top six teams qualified for the championship playoffs whilst the two last qualified were relegated to Division 1.

Regular season

Playoffs
Playoffs were played between the eight teams of the competition, with a best-of-five series in a 1-1-1-1-1 format. The seeded team played games 1, 3 and 5 at home. The Finals will be played in a best-of-seven series and the bronze medal series as a single game.

Attendances
Attendances include playoff games:

References

External links
Official Basketligaen website

Basketligaen seasons
Danish
Basketball
Basketball